Eoophyla principensis is a moth in the family Crambidae. It was described by David John Lawrence Agassiz in 2012. It is found on the island of Príncipe in São Tomé and Príncipe off the west coast of Africa.

The wingspan is about 11 mm. The base of the forewings is fuscous, with a white median area with a pale brown fascia. The hindwings are whitish, scattered with pale fuscous scales and a yellow median fascia, a dark fuscous subterminal line.

Etymology
The species name refers to Príncipe, the type locality.

References

Eoophyla
Moths described in 2012